Believo! is the debut album by the indie rock band Enon. It was released in 2000 on See Thru Broadcasting. The second pressing of the vinyl edition included a bonus 7" record. The out-of-print album was reissued by Touch and Go Records in 2007.

Critical reception
Cincinnati CityBeat called the album "a rollicking slab of head-turning, style-juggling wax," writing that "a hydrant's flow of ideas percolate themselves into skewed pop songs." Exclaim! wrote that "with a disparate fusion of down and dirty guitar rock aesthetic, funky vibes and totally organic grooves, this NYC-based trio could well be the North American answer to the Beta Band." The Washington Post wrote that Believo! "is cutting-edge cut-up pop that surprises—in songs like 'Get the Letter Out'—by daring to be tuneful." The Stranger deemed it "a punchy, melody-packed blend of techno, new wave, and pop punk."

Track listing
 "Rubber Car" – 2:31
 "Cruel" – 2:33
 "Conjugate the Verbs" – 3:12
 "Believo!" – 2:09
 "Come Into" – 3:14
 "Matters Gray" – 3:25
 "Get the Letter Out" – 2:56
 "World in a Jar" – 3:16
 "For the Sum of It" – 5:11
 "Elected" – 1:41
 "Biofeedback" – 2:38

7"
 "To Whom It May Consume"
 "Suz EQ"

References

External links
Enon.tv official website

2000 debut albums
Enon (band) albums
Albums produced by Dave Sardy